Namak Lake (i.e., salt lake) is a salt lake in Iran.

The lake is a remnant of the Paratethys sea, which started to dry from the Pleistocene epoch, leaving Lake Urmia and the Caspian Sea and other bodies of water. The most important water supply is the river Qom.

Lakes of Iran
Endorheic lakes of Asia
Landforms of Qom Province
Salt flats